

Medalists

Heats

Semifinals

Final

60 metres hurdles at the World Athletics Indoor Championships
60 metres hurdles Men